Lake Calibato is one of the seven crater lakes collectively called Pitong Lawa or Seven Lakes of San Pablo in Laguna province in the Philippines. The lake is situated in Brgy. Sto. Angel in San Pablo City. Its supplies the city and nearby towns with abundant fish and aquatic plants. The lake is the deepest recorded lake among the seven-lake system; no recorded depths are available for Muhikap.

Legend
It was told that the area was once a valley inhabited by a Diwata (benevolent fairy or nymph) who had wanted to keep her realm free from the intrusion of mankind. Thus, she was angered when people built rocky pathways that criss-crossed her valley. She then caused a strong earthquake and severe storm that transformed her valley into a lagoon.

The villagers living in the surrounding hills were awestruck the following morning, and named the body of water Lake Calibato, taken from the criss-crossing stone pathways of the valley, a portmanteau of Cali (corrupted from the Spanish calle, "street") and the Tagalog Bato ("rock").

References
 The Legend of Lake Calibato
 San Pablo City

External links
Geographic data related to Lake Calibato at OpenStreetMap

Seven Lakes of San Pablo
Volcanic crater lakes
Maars of the Philippines
Volcanic lakes of the Philippines